A Diocese of Åbo, alias of Turku (in fact all Finland) was the Catholic medieval predecessor of the Archdiocese of Turku.

History 
 Established circa 1150? as Diocese of Åbo / Turku / Abœn(sis) (Latin adjective), on Finnish territory split off from the Swedish then Diocese of Uppsala (later Metropolitan)
 Suppressed on 1522.07.22, without direct Catholic successor
TO ELABORATE 
It was probably founded in the 12th century, but the Bishop of Finland is first mentioned only in 1209. Diocese seems to have been independent of secular powers until the so-called Second Swedish Crusade in 1249. The diocese was renamed as the Diocese of Turku by 1259 at the latest, by which time it had been assimilated to the set of Swedish dioceses.

The see was located in Nousiainen by 1234, when Bishop Thomas signed a letter there. The bishop had received papal approval for the transfer of the see in 1229, but it is not known if the transfer actually took place. If the see had been located somewhere else before, the location is unknown. The see was later moved to Koroinen close to the current cathedral of Turku, probably soon after the Swedish conquest in 1249.

Episcopal ordinaries
(all Roman Rite)

Suffragan Bishops of Åbo 
Bishops of Finland are usually included in the list of Bishops of Turku.
 Saint Henry = Henrik (born England) (1150? – 1152), next Bishop of Uppsala (Sweden) (1152 – death 1156.01.20)
 Rodulff (? – death 1178?)
 Folkvin (? – ?)
 Tuomas, Dominican Order (O.P.) (1209.10.30 – death 1248)
 Bero (1249 – death 1253)
 Ragvald (? – death 1266)
 Ragvald (? – death 1266)
 Johan, O.P. (1286/1290-07-08), next Metropolitan Archbishop of Uppsala (Sweden) (1290-07-08/1291-09-08)
 ...

See also 
 List of Catholic dioceses in Finland
 Bishop of Turku
 List of Bishops of Turku
 Second Swedish Crusade

Sources 
 GCatholic

External links
 GCatholic

Former Roman Catholic dioceses in Europe
Suppressed Roman Catholic dioceses
Catholic Church in Finland
12th century in Finland
History of Christianity in Finland